Italian prisoners of war in the Soviet Union is the narrative of POWs from the Italian Army in Russia (the ARMIR and CSIR) and of their fate in Stalin's Soviet Union during and after World War II.

Characteristics

Over 60,000 Italian prisoners of war (POWs) were taken captive by the Red Army in the Second World War. Almost all of them were captured during the decisive Soviet "Operation Little Saturn" offensive in December 1942 which annihilated the Italian Army in Russia (Armata Italiana in Russia (ARMIR)).

At its height, the ARMIR was about 235,000 strong, and operated between December 1942 and February 1943 in support of the German forces engaged in and around Stalingrad. In this period the total figure of missing Italian soldiers amounted to 84,830 (Italian Ministry of Defence, 1977a 1977b). According to the Soviet archives, 54,400 Italian prisoners of war reached the Soviet prisoner camps alive; 44,315 prisoners (over 81%) died in captivity inside the camps, most of them in the winter of 1943.

A list of the soldiers' names, in Cyrillic, including date and place of death was yielded by the Russian authorities after 1989 (Italian Ministry of Defence, 1996). 10,085 prisoners were repatriated between 1945 and 1954. The individual fate of 30,430 soldiers, who died during the fighting and the withdrawal or after capture, is less well known. It is estimated that about 20,000 men lost their lives due to the fighting and 10,000 men died between the time they became prisoners to the time they registered inside the camps.

Russian sources list the deaths of  28,000 of the 49,000 Italian war prisoners (according to them) in Soviet Union 1942–1954.

The way to the POW camps

Travel to the destination camps in captivity covered hundreds of kilometres and was done mainly on foot. They were reported by survivors as the "davai" marches. "Davai!" is a Russian expression of urging, in this context meaning "keep moving!". The prisoners were escorted by Red Army, and often, partisans without mercy for those who fell down frozen or exhausted (Revelli, 1966). The transfer was completed by using freight trains, where many prisoners died of the extremely cold temperatures and lack of food.

Camps, treatment and causes of death

Suzdal 160, Tambov, Oranki, Krinovoje, Michurinsk, sited in Eastern European Russia, were the camps where most Italian POWs were detained in dismal conditions. Others were known just by their reference numbers, as Lager 58/c and Lager 171 (Italian Ministry of Defence, 1996). Typhus and starvation related diseases were the major causes of mortality inside the camps (Giusti, 2003). Brutality from the Soviet troops and partisans to unarmed prisoners was reported, but survivors testified also to episodes of comradeship among soldiers of the two opposing nations, especially on the front line (Rigoni Stern, 1965) and, compassion from the Russian civilians (Vio, 2004).

The Italian prisoners of war in the Soviet Union were subject to plenty of propaganda.  The propaganda was delivered by Italian Communist cadres who had fled fascism in Italy to the Soviet Union, known in Italy as fuoriusciti (expatriates) (Zilli, 1950). Despite allurements and threats most of the prisoners, particularly if not previously compromised by fascism, resisted the propaganda (Giusti, 2000). Prisoners' conditions improved greatly with the spring of 1943 because of Soviet Government concern and better camp administration, sharply increasing the food supply and the numbers of soldiers surviving.

War criminals

Most of the survivors were allowed to return to Italy in 1945–1946. In the same years, a group of Italian officers under detention were accused of war crimes and sentenced to many years of forced labour. After the death of Stalin the accusations proved to be false and they were released in 1954 (Reginato, 1965).

The Italians in the Soviet Union had not acted as occupation troops, and atrocities against partisans and civilians were therefore unlikely. Soviets captured by the Italian Expeditionary Corps in Russia (Corpo di Spedizione Italiano in Russia, CSIR), which operated from July 1941 to June 1942, were delivered to the Germans and endured cruel treatment by the Nazis. After the establishment of the ARMIR, Soviet prisoners were kept in Italian custody in reasonable conditions. For instance, Russian POWs were fed with standard Italian Army rations (Ricchezza, 1978).

Reasons for forgotten tragedy

The issue of Italian prisoners of war in the Soviet Union remained a hot political topic in post-war Italy. It was never seriously investigated because of the Soviet authorities' unwillingness to yield information about the destiny of the tens of thousands of missing soldiers. Their case was used in an instrumental way by the centre-right parties which accused the Soviet Union of not returning its prisoners of war (Democrazia Cristiana manifesto, 1948), and denied as anti-communist propaganda by the left (Robotti) during the first democratic elections in Italy (1948). Unbiased information underpinning the size of the tragedy and an objective historical reconstruction came only after the fall of the Soviet Union (Giusti, 2003) when most public interest in Italy had already faded away.

References

 CHIDK (Centr Hranenja Istoriko-Documentalnoj Kollekcij, F. 1p, 1/4b, 4/n,b 4/1,b, 4/4,b)
 Democrazia Cristiana manifesto. Mandati in Russia dai Fascisti, trattenuti dai comunisti, 1948
Giusti, Maria Teresa. La propaganda anti-fascista tra i prigionieri di guerra Italiani nell'URSS. Il Mulino, Bologna, anno 3, numero 3, September 2000
 Giusti, Maria Teresa. I prigionieri italiani in Russia. Il Mulino Bologna 2003
 Italian Ministry of Defence. Stato Maggiore Esercito. Ufficio Storico. Le operazioni del CSIR e dell'ARMIR dal Giugno 1941 all'ottobre del 1942. Roma, 1977
 Italian Ministry of Defence. Stato Maggiore Esercito. Ufficio Storico. Le operazioni delle unità italiane al fronte russo 1941-1942. Roma 1977
 Italian Ministry of Defence. Commissariato Generale Onoranze Caduti in Guerra. CSIR-ARMIR, Campi di prigionia e fosse comuni. Stabilimento grafico militare, Gaeta 1996.
 Clementi, Marco. "L'alleato Stalin". Rizzoli 2011
 Reginato, Enrico. Dodici anni di prigionia nell'URSS. Garzanti 1965
 Revelli, Nuto. La strada del Davai. Einaudi Torino 1966
 RGASPI (Rossiskiy Gosudarstvennyj Arhiv Social'no-Političeskoj Istorii f. 495 o 77: d. 26, d. 21a, d. 25, d. 26, d. 27, d. 39, d. 40, d. 49)
 Rigoni Stern, Mario. Il sergente nella neve. Einaudi 1965
 Ricchezza, Antonio. Storia Illustrata di tutta la campagna di Russia: luglio 1941 – maggio 1943. Longanesi 1978
 Robotti, Paolo. Perché non si è fatta luce sulla campagna di Russia. Dove sono i soldati dell'ARMIR. Supplemento all'Unità, 13 Agosto 1948
 Valori, Aldo. La campagna di Russia CSIR, ARMIR 1941-1943. Roma 1951
 Vio, Emilio. Corvi sulla neve. Roma Ellemme 2004
Werth, Alexander. Russia at war: 1941-1945. Carroll & Graf, New York 1964
 Zilli, Valdo. Fascisti e anti-fascisti. Il trattamento politico dei prigionieri di guerra nell'URSS. In 'Il ponte'', anno 6, No 11, November 1950

See also
Italian prisoners of war in Australia
Italian participation in the Eastern Front
Military history of Italy during World War II
World War II casualties
World War II casualties of the Soviet Union

Soviet Union
Military history of Italy during World War II
Italian
Italy–Soviet Union relations